José Miguel Varas (1928 – 23 September 2011) was a Chilean writer. He won the Chilean National Prize for Literature in 2006.

References

1928 births
2011 deaths
Chilean male writers
National Prize for Literature (Chile) winners